Andy Beadsworth (born: 28 April 1967, in Nottingham) is a sailor from Great Britain, who represented his country at the 1996 Summer Olympics in Savannah, United States as helmsman in the Soling. With crew members Barry Parkin and Adrian Stead they took the 4th place. During the 2000 Summer Olympics in Sydney, Australia Andy took 12th place in the Soling with crew members Barry Parkin and Richard Sydenham.

References

1967 births
Living people
Sailors at the 1996 Summer Olympics – Soling
Sailors at the 2000 Summer Olympics – Soling
Olympic sailors of Great Britain
Sportspeople from Nottingham
British male sailors (sport)